Klim is a village in North Jutland, Denmark. It is located in Jammerbugt Municipality.

History
A train station was located in Klim between 1904 and 1969. The station was built by Heinrich Wenck, and it was a stop on the Thisted-Fjerritslev railroad.

References

Cities and towns in the North Jutland Region
Jammerbugt Municipality
Villages in Denmark